Harald Nicolai Samuelsberg (6 November 1911 – 23 April 1986) was a Norwegian politician for the Labour Party.

Biography
He was born in Loppa and his only education was high school, which he completed at the age of seventeen.

He was elected to the Norwegian Parliament from Finnmark in 1958, and was re-elected on two occasions. He had previously served as a deputy representative in the period 1950–1953.

Samuelsberg was mayor of Loppa municipality during the term 1959–1961, and deputy mayor in 1962–1963. In total he held various positions from 1937–1940 and 1947–1967.

References

1911 births
1986 deaths
People from Loppa
Labour Party (Norway) politicians
Members of the Storting
20th-century Norwegian politicians